"I Can Tell You About Pain" is a single by American metalcore band Converge. It was released on July 25, 2017, as a 7-inch vinyl record via Epitaph and Deathwish, Inc., with the much longer track "Eve" as a B-side. The music video for the song "I Can Tell You About Pain" was directed by Tony Wolski.

Music and critical reception
Consequence of Sound's Randall Colburn wrote: ""Eve" serves as a contrast to "I Can Tell You About Pain", as its seven-plus minutes incorporate group chants and menacing synths into its crashing guitars and pummeling percussion, giving the song an eerie epicness." Stereogum writer Tom Breihan described "Eve" as "a monstrous epic", and stated: "Both songs are punishing in very different ways." Pitchfork critic Saby Reyes-Kulkarni thought that "I Can Tell You About Pain"'s production style "almost leans in a black metal direction, giving the song a deceptively quick-and-dirty sound." Reyes-Kulkarni further stated: "This ability to switch from surgically precise to blunt and back again is what keeps Converge continually gripping."

Andy Cush of Spin wrote: "The former ["I Can Tell You About Pain"] is quick and raw, finding the band in full-on firebreathing madness mode; the latter ["Eve"] is an unusually moody epic that clocks in at nearly eight minutes long." Graham Hartmann from Loudwire described "Eve" as "a more experimental piece of Converge's catalogue", stating: "Focusing on doom and drone characteristics, Converge stretch out the expansive track in a way that feels truly inspired. Kurt Ballou's production is top-notch, as always, building a colossal wall of sound for "Eve" that remains dense even in its softest moments." Treble Zine wrote that the former track is "an intense, rhythmically jerky noise-rock burner" while the latter "has some common traits with Oakland sludge innovators Neurosis, with whom the band is touring this summer."

Accolades

Track listing
All songs written by Converge.
 "I Can Tell You About Pain" – 2:24
 "Eve" – 7:36

Personnel 
Converge
 Jacob Bannon – vocals, lyrics
 Kurt Ballou – guitars, vocals, keyboards, production
 Nate Newton – bass
 Ben Koller – drums, percussion

References

External links
 

Converge (band) songs
Deathwish Inc. albums
2017 EPs
Albums produced by Kurt Ballou